is a festival celebrated in Oga and Katagami, Akita Prefecture, Japan. The main event is on 7 July. In 1986 it was designated an Important Intangible Folk Cultural Property.

See also
Japanese festivals
List of festivals in Japan
List of Important Intangible Folk Cultural Properties
Intangible Cultural Property (Japan)

References

Festivals in Japan
Festivals in Akita Prefecture
Important Intangible Folk Cultural Properties